Saint-Baussant is a commune in the Meurthe-et-Moselle department in north-eastern France.

It was formerly known as Saint-Baussonne, ultimately from Sanctus Balsamus.

The Rupt de Mad flows northeastward through the middle of the commune and forms part of its northern border.

See also
Communes of the Meurthe-et-Moselle department

References

Saintbaussant